Regional Pacific Airlines was an airline based in Queensland, Australia. It was established and started operations in May 2001 and operated scheduled services from Horn Island in Queensland.

On Tuesday 29 June 2010, it was announced that Regional Pacific Airlines had gone into administration and all business and flight operations were stopped.

Fleet 

As of May 2009, the Regional Pacific Airlines fleet includes two (2) Embraer EMB 120ER Brasilia aircraft.

Destinations 
As of November 2009, Regional Pacific Airlines operated scheduled service to the following domestic destinations:
 Alice Springs (ASP) – Alice Springs Airport (1 flight daily to Mount Isa)
 Bamaga (BAM) – Northern Peninsula Airport (2 flights daily to Cairns)
 Cairns (CNS) – Cairns Airport (2 flights daily to Bamaga, 3 flights daily to Mount Isa)
 Mount Isa (ISA) – Mount Isa Airport (2 flights daily to Alice Springs, 3 flights daily to Cairns)

See also
List of defunct airlines of Australia
 Aviation in Australia

References

External links
 Regional Pacific Airlines redirects to Regional Pacific Travel Guide
 Aircraft photos - Regional Pacific Airlines at Airliners.net
 Aircraft photos - Regional Pacific Airlines at Jetphotos.net
 Regional Pacific Airlines Closes and goes into Administration - retrieved Tuesday 6 July 2010 

Defunct airlines of Australia
Regional Aviation Association of Australia
Airlines established in 2001
Airlines disestablished in 2010
2001 establishments in Australia
2010 disestablishments in Australia